Andrena coitana  is a Palearctic species of mining bee.

References

External links
Images representing Andrena coitana 

Hymenoptera of Europe
coitana
Insects described in 1802